Cardium (from Greek καρδίᾱ kardiā, heart) may refer to:

 -cardium,  a combining form used in terms associated with the heart such as pericardium, epicardium and endocardium
 , a genus of molluscs in the family Cardiidae
 Cardium edule, now named Cerastoderma edule, the common cockle 
 Cardium Formation, a stratigraphic range in western Canada
 Cardium pottery, a Neolithic decorative style